The 1970 California Attorney General election was held on November 3, 1970. Republican nominee Evelle J. Younger defeated Democratic nominee Charles A. O'Brien with 49.28% of the vote.

Primary elections
Primary elections were held on June 9, 1970.

Democratic primary

Candidates
Charles A. O'Brien, attorney
Walter Culpepper

Results

Republican primary

Candidates
Evelle J. Younger, Los Angeles County District Attorney
John L. Harmer, State Senator
Spencer Mortimer Williams, former Secretary of the California State Human Relations Agency
George Deukmejian, State Senator

Results

General election

Candidates
Major party candidates
Evelle J. Younger, Republican
Charles A. O'Brien, Democratic

Other candidate's
Marguerite M. "Marge" Buckley, Peace and Freedom

Results

References

1970
Attorney General
California